Robert Murray Gordon "Rob" McConnell,  (14 February 1935 – 1 May 2010) was a Canadian jazz trombonist, composer, and arranger. McConnell is best known for establishing and leading the big band The Boss Brass, which he directed from 1967 to 1999.

Biography
McConnell was born in London, Ontario, Canada, and took up the valve trombone in high school. He began his performing career in the early 1950s, performing and studying with Clifford Brown, Don Thompson, Bobby Gimby, and later with Canadian trumpeter Maynard Ferguson. He studied music theory with Gordon Delamont. In 1968 he formed The Boss Brass, a big band that became his primary performing and recording unit through the 1970s, 1980s, and 1990s.

McConnell assembled the original Boss Brass from Toronto studio musicians. The instrumentation of the band was originally sixteen pieces, consisting of trumpets, trombones, French horns, and a rhythm section but no saxophones. He introduced a saxophone section in 1970 and expanded the trumpet section to include the fifth trumpet in 1976, bringing the total to twenty-two members.

In 1977, McConnell recorded a double LP called Big Band Jazz.  This was a 'direct cut' LP using Direct-to-disc recording.  A small number of albums that recorded direct-to-disc began to appear on the market in the late 1970s and were marketed as "audiophile" editions, promising superior sound quality compared with recordings made using the more common multi-track tape recording methods.  On McConnell's direct cut double LP, an entire side (15 minutes and 2 seconds) was devoted to a version of Gershwin's "Porgy and Bess".  The double album won the Juno Award for Best Jazz Album in 1978.  His 1983  All in Good Time album won the Grammy Award for Best Large Jazz Ensemble recording.

In 1988, McConnell took a teaching position at the Dick Grove School of Music in California, but gave up his position and returned to Canada a year later. In 1992 he was presented with a SOCAN jazz award. In 1997, he was inducted into the Canadian Music Hall of Fame, and in 1998 was made an Officer of the Order of Canada. He remained active throughout the 2000s, touring internationally as both a performer and educator, running music clinics around the world and performing as a leader and guest artist. The Rob McConnell Tentet, a scaled-down version of the Boss Brass featuring many Boss Brass alumni, recorded three albums, The Rob McConnell Tentet (2000), Thank You, Ted (2002), and Music of the Twenties (2003).

McConnell died of liver cancer on May 1, 2010 in Toronto at the age of 75.

Discography

The Boss Brass
 The Boss Brass - Rob McConnell (1968), Canadian Talent Library
 Rob McConnell's Boss Brass 2 (1969), Canadian Talent Library
 The Sound Of The Boss Brass (1970), CBC Radio Canada
 On a Cool Day (1971), Canadian Talent Library
 Rob McConnell's Boss Brass 4 (1972), Canadian Talent Library
 The Best Damn Band in the Land (1974), United Artists Records
 The Jazz Album (1976), Attic Records
 Nobody Does It Better (1977), Canadian Talent Library, Phonodisc
 Big Band Jazz (1978), Umbrella Records
 Again! (1979), Umbrella Records
 Are Ya Dancin' Disco? (1979), New Ventures
 The Singers Unlimited with Rob McConnell and The Boss Brass (1980), MPS Records
 Present Perfect (1980), MPS Records
 Tribute (1981), Pausa Records
 Live in Digital (1982), Sea Breeze, Palo Alto Records
 Big Band Jazz Volume 1 (1983), Pausa Records
 Again! Volume 1 (1983), Pausa Records
 Big Band Jazz Volume 2 (1983), Pausa Records
 All in Good Time (1983), Sea Breeze, Palo Alto Records
 Again! Volume 2 (1983), Pausa Records
 Atras Da Porta (1985), Innovation Records
 Boss Brass and Woods (1985), Innovation Records
 Mel Tormé, Rob McConnell and the Boss Brass (1986), Concord Jazz
 The Brass Is Back (1991), Concord Jazz
 Brassy and Sassy (1992), Concord Jazz
 Our 25th Year (1993), Concord Jazz
 Overtime (1994), Concord Jazz
 Don't Get Around Much Anymore (1995), Concord Jazz
 Velvet and Brass (1995), Concord Jazz
 Even Canadians Get the Blues (1996), Concord Jazz
 Rob McConnell and the Boss Brass Play the Jazz Classics (1997), Concord Jazz
 Big Band Christmas (1998), Concord Jazz
 The Concord Jazz Heritage Series (1998, compilation), Concord Jazz
 Two Originals (Brass My Soul & Tribute)(1998, compilation), MPS Records
 ...One More Time! Live At The Old Mill Inn (2008), JAZZ.FM91

The Rob McConnell Tentet
 Rob McConnell Tentet (2000), Justin Time Records
 Thank You, Ted (2002), Justin Time Records
 Music of the Twenties (2003), Justin Time Records
 Justin Time For Christmas Four (2004), Justin Time Records

Other
 A Canadian Christmas - Noël Canadien (1980, with Bob Hamper), CBC Radio Canada
 Trombone Rob (1982), Canadian Talent Library
 Mutual Street (1984, with Ed Bickert), Innovation Records 
 Old Friends, New Music (1985, with Rick Wilkins, Guido Basso, Ed Bickert, Steve Wallace and Terry Clarke ), Unisson Records
 The Boss of the Boss Brass (1988, orchestra with strings and woodwinds), Duke Street Records
 Live At The 1990 Concord Jazz Festival, First Set (1991, with Ed Bickert, Alan Dawson, Harry Edison, Al Grey, Gene Harris, Benny Powell and Neil Swainson), Concord Jazz
 The Rob McConnell Jive 5 (1990, with Ed Bickert, Jerry Fuller, Neil Swainson and Rick Wilkins), Concord Jazz
 Manny Albam, Rob McConnell And The SDR Big Band Featuring Herb Geller (1993), Intercord
 Trio Sketches (1994, with Ed Bickert and Neil Swainson), Concord Jazz
 Three for the Road (1997, with Ed Bickert and Don Thompson), Concord Jazz
 Riffs I Have Known (2000), Recall/Snapper Music
 Live with the Boss - Rob McConnell & Big Band Brass (2001), Black & Blue Records
  So Very Rob, Boss Brass Revisited (2003, with The SWR Big Band, recorded in Germany), Hanssler

Guest and backing appearances, arrangements, compilation inclusions
 Cool and Hot Sax - Moe Koffman Septette (1957), Jubilee Records
 Color Him Wild - Maynard Ferguson (1964), Mainstream Records
 Love Talk - Guido Basso (1971), Kanata Records, Canadian Broadcasting Corporation
 Songs for the New Industrial State - Doug Randle (2009), Kanata Records, Canadian Broadcasting Corporation
 Jazz Canadiana: All Star Jazz In Concert (1973, compilation), CBC Radio Canada
 My Heart Belongs To Me - Rick Wilkins Orchestra (1977), Phonodisc
 And All That Latin Jazz! - Guido Basso (1978), Canadian Talent Library
 Back Again - The Hi-Lo's (1979), MPS Records
 Out of the Shadows - Chris Vadala (1979), Art of Life Records
 Swing Fever - All Star Swing Band (1982), CBS Direct
 Play The Compositions And Arrangements Of Bill Holman - Vic Lewis West Coast All Stars (1989), Mole Jazz
 Let's Eat Home - Dave Frishberg (1990), Concord Jazz
 Plays Bill Holman - Vic Lewis West Coast All Stars (1993), Candid Records
 From Lush To Lively - Oliver Jones, Justin Time Records
 Lookin' Good - Dave Frishberg (2001), Concord Jazz
 Justin Time Records 20th Anniversary Compilation (2003), Justin Time Records
 Jazz Moods: Sounds Of Autumn (2004, compilation), Concord Special Products
 Jazz Moods: Jazz At The North Pole (2004, compilation), Concord Special Products
 Instant Party - Mel Tormé (2004, compilation), Concord Jazz
 I'm New Here - MHCC Jazz Band (2004), Sea Breeze
 From the Top - Music! Its Role and Importance In Our Lives (2005), Glencoe/McGraw-Hill Education
 Jazz After Dark II (2005), Playboy Jazz
 Swingchronicity - Phil Woods, DePaul University Jazz Ensemble (2007), Jazzed Media
 Just Friends - The Texas Christian University Jazz Ensemble (2009), Sea Breeze Vista Records
 The Complete Quebec Jam Session July 28, 1955 - Clifford Brown (2009), Rare Live Recordings
 The Complete 1975 Toronto Recordings - Paul Desmond Quartet (2020), Mosaic Records

Awards and nominations

Juno Awards
 Nominee, Best Jazz Album, Rob McConnell and the Boss Brass The Jazz Album, Juno Awards of 1977
 Winner, Best Jazz Album, Rob McConnell and the Boss Brass, Big Band Jazz, Juno Awards of 1978
 Winner, Recording Engineer of the Year - David Green, Big Band Jazz, Juno Awards of 1978
 Nominee, Best Jazz Album, Again!, Juno Awards of 1980
 Winner, Best Jazz Album, Present Perfect, Juno Awards of 1981
 Nominee, Best Jazz Album, Live In Digital, Rob McConnell and the Boss Brass, Juno Awards of 1982
 Winner, Best Jazz Album, All In Good Time, Rob McConnell and the Boss Brass, Juno Awards of 1984
 Nominee, Best Jazz Album, Atras De Porta, Rob McConnell and the Boss Brass, Juno Awards of 1986
 Nominee, Best Jazz Album, Old Friends, New Music, The Rob McConnell Sextet, Juno Awards of 1986
 Nominee, Recording Engineer of the Year - Phil Sheridan, "Ellington", Mel Tormé, Rob McConnell and the Boss Brass, Juno Awards of 1987
 Winner, Best Jazz Album, The Brass Is Back, Rob McConnell and the Boss Brass, Juno Awards of 1992
 Nominee, Best Jazz Album, Brassy and Sassy, Rob McConnell and the Boss Brass, Juno Awards of 1993
 Nominee, Best Mainstream Jazz Album, Our 25th Year, Rob McConnell and the Boss Brass, Juno Awards of 1994
 Nominee, Best Mainstream Jazz Album, Overtime, Rob McConnell and the Boss Brass, Juno Awards of 1995
 Nominee, Best Mainstream Jazz Album, Even Canadians Get the Blues, Rob McConnell and the Boss Brass, Juno Awards of 1997
 Winner, Best Traditional Jazz Album, Rob McConnell Tentet, Rob McConnell Tentet, Juno Awards of 2001 
 Nominee, Traditional Jazz Album of the Year, Thank You, Ted, Rob McConnell Tentet, Juno Awards of 2003

Grammy Awards
 Nominee, Best Jazz Instrumental Performance, Big Band, Big Band Jazz, Rob McConnell and the Boss Brass, 1979
 Nominee, Best Arrangement Accompanying Vocalist(s), "Tangerine", The Singers Unlimited with Rob McConnell and The Boss Brass, 1980
 Nominee, Best Jazz Instrumental Performance, Big Band, Present Perfect, Rob McConnell and The Boss Brass, 1981
 Nominee, Best Jazz Instrumental Performance, Big Band, "Tribute", Tribute, Rob McConnell and The Boss Brass, 1982
 Nominee, Best Jazz Instrumental Performance, Big Band, Live In Digital, Rob McConnell and The Boss Brass, 1983
 Winner, Best Jazz Instrumental Performance, Big Band, All In Good Time, Rob McConnell and The Boss Brass, 26th Annual Grammy Awards, 1984
 Nominee, Best Arrangement On An Instrumental, "I Got Rhythm", All In Good Time, Rob McConnell and The Boss Brass, 1984
 Nominee, Best Large Jazz Ensemble Performance, The Brass Is Back, Rob McConnell and The Boss Brass, 1992
 Winner, Best Arrangement on an Instrumental, "Strike Up The Band", Brassy And Sassy, Rob McConnell, 35th  Annual Grammy Awards, 1993 
 Nominee, Best Large Jazz Ensemble Performance, Brassy And Sassy, Rob McConnell and The Boss Brass, 1993
 Nominee, Best Large Jazz Ensemble Performance, Our 25th Year, Rob McConnell and The Boss Brass, 1994
 Winner, Best Instrumental Arrangement With Accompanying Vocal(s), "I Get A Kick Out Of You", Mel Tormé, Rob McConnell and the Boss Brass, Rob McConnell, 38th  Annual Grammy Awards, 1996
 Nominee, Best Large Jazz Ensemble Performance, Even Canadians Get The Blues, Rob McConnell and The Boss Brass, 1997
 Nominee, Best Instrumental Arrangement, "What Are You Doing New Year's Eve?", Big Band Christmas, Rob McConnell and the Boss Brass, Rob McConnell, 1999
 Nominee, Best Large Jazz Ensemble Album, Rob McConnell Tentet, Rob McConnell Tentet, 2002
 Nominee, Best Instrumental Arrangement, "Autumn In New York", So Very Rob, Boss Brass Revisited, Rob McConnell And The SWR Big Band, Rob McConnell, 2004

Canadian National Jazz Awards
 Arranger of the Year, Rob McConnell, 2002
 Trombonist of the Year, Rob McConnell, 2002
 Arranger of the Year, Rob McConnell, 2003
 Trombonist of the Year, Rob McConnell, 2003
 Acoustic Group of the Year, The Rob McConnell Tentet, 2003
 Big Band of the Year, The Rob McConnell Tentet, 2003
 Arranger of the Year, Rob McConnell, 2004
 Trombonist of the Year, Rob McConnell, 2004
 Big Band of the Year, The Rob McConnell Tentet, 2004
 Big Band of the Year, The Rob McConnell Tentet, 2005
 Trombonist of the Year, Rob McConnell, 2006
 Big Band of the Year, The Rob McConnell Tentet, 2006

Honours
 Awarded, Honorary Doctor of Letters, St. Francis Xavier University, 1986
 Awarded, SOCAN Jazz Award, Society of Composers, Authors and Music Publishers of Canada, 1992
 Awarded, Prix Oscar Peterson, Montreal International Jazz Festival, 1997
 Inducted, Canadian Music Hall of Fame, Juno Awards of 1997
 Named, Officer of the Order of Canada, 1998
 Awarded, SOCAN National Achievement Award, Society of Composers, Authors and Music Publishers of Canada, 1999

See also

Music of Canada
Canadian Music Hall of Fame

References

External links

 Toronto Star Obituary
 Manuscript scores at University of Toronto Music Library

1935 births
2010 deaths
Big band bandleaders
Canadian jazz trombonists
Canadian Music Hall of Fame inductees
Deaths from cancer in Ontario
Grammy Award winners
Officers of the Order of Canada
Palo Alto Records artists
Pausa Records artists
Musicians from London, Ontario
Swing trombonists
Juno Award for Best Jazz Album winners
Canadian jazz composers
Male jazz composers
Canadian jazz bandleaders
20th-century Canadian composers
20th-century trombonists
Juno Award for Traditional Jazz Album of the Year winners
20th-century Canadian male musicians
Black & Blue Records artists
MPS Records artists
Concord Records artists
20th-century jazz composers